Stocka is a locality situated in Nordanstig Municipality, Gävleborg County, Sweden with 382 inhabitants in 2010.

References 

Populated places in Nordanstig Municipality
Hälsingland